Martin Havelka (10 July 1958 – 2 October 2020) was a Czech actor and dubbing actor.

Biography
Havelka was born in Karlovy Vary. At the start of his career he acted at the Divadlo Husa na provázku; then he acted at National Theatre Brno. He was a member of Brno City Theatre from 1999 until his death in 2020.

Havelka died on 2 October 2020, aged 62.

Role at Brno City Theatre 
 Truffaldino – Servant of Two Masters
 Cafourek – Škola základ života
 Lujko Zobar – Cikáni jdou do nebe
 Jindřich Hradský – My Fair Lady (ze Zelňáku)
 Kapitán četnictva – Koločava
 Pilát Pontský – Jesus Christ Superstar
 Asim – Balada o lásce (Singoalla) 
 Darryl – The Witches of Eastwick
 Marian – Nahá múza
 Kůň – Le Dîner de Cons
 Georg Banks – Mary Poppins
 Orin – Little Shop of Horrors
 Petruccio – The Taming of the Shrew

References

External links

  Martin Havelka on www.mdb.cz

1958 births
2020 deaths
Actors from Karlovy Vary
Czech male stage actors
Actors of Městské divadlo Brno
20th-century Czech male actors
21st-century Czech male actors
Czech male voice actors
Czech male film actors
Czech male television actors